Aleiodes tashimai is a species of parasitoid wasp from Japan. It was first described by Kanetosi Kusigemati in 1983 as Rogas tashimai. It is a parasitoid of Sbopula epiorrhoe.

References 

Braconidae
Insects described in 1983